Vittorio Coco (born November 11, 1939) is an Italian and Canadian journalist and politician. He has worked at CHIN radio in Toronto since 1973 and was for many years the host of an Italian-language morning program. Coco ran for the Italian Senate in the 2006 and 2008 general elections.

Early life and career
Coco was born in Roccagorga, a small town near Rome. He studied journalism in Rome and worked in print media after graduating.

He moved to Edmonton, Alberta, Canada, in 1959 and intended to start an Italian-language newspaper in the city (at the time, he has noted, there were no Italian journals in Canada west of Winnipeg). He instead became involved in radio, overseeing Italian-language programming at the Canadian Broadcasting Corporation's CHFA in Edmonton and broadcasting from Expo '67 in Montreal, Quebec.

Toronto broadcaster
Coco joined CHIN radio in Toronto in 1972 as its news director. Later in the same year, he became the debut host of "Wake-Up Italian Style," the station's Italian-language morning show. He celebrated his twenty-sixth year on the air in 1998, excepting a short period of time in the 1970s when he hosted an afternoon program. Under Coco's watch, "Wake-Up Italian Style" featured a combination of music and spoken-word content, including new hit material from Italy. Coco has also worked for "Festival Italiano di Johnny Lombardi" program on CHIN-TV.

Politician
Coco ran for the Italian Senate in the 2006 and 2008 general elections in a division reserved for Italian citizens living in North American and Central America. He was a candidate of the Union of Christian and Centre Democrats in 2006 and ran for its successor party, the Union of the Centre, in 2008. He was defeated on both occasions. Coco received credible support in Toronto in 2006, but did not poll well elsewhere.

Coco identifies as a Roman Catholic and has said he has always supported the Christian Democrats and successor parties in Italian politics. He has served as the Union of the Centre's political secretary in Canada.

Electoral record

References

External links
Vittorio Coco's Website

1939 births
Canadian radio hosts
Canadian people of Italian descent
Politicians from Toronto
Living people